Drum Creek is a  long 1st order tributary to Roy Creek, in Sussex County, Delaware.

Course
Drum Creek rises on the Bearhole Ditch divide at Williamsville in Sussex County, Delaware.  Drum Creek then flows east to meet Roy Creek at Keen-Wik, Delaware.

Watershed
Drum Creek drains  of area, receives about 44.5 in/year of precipitation, has a topographic wetness index of 779.20 and is about 1.25% forested.

See also
List of rivers of Delaware

References 

Rivers of Delaware